Eugene Roy Fidell (born March 31, 1945) is an American lawyer specializing in military law. He is currently the Florence Rogatz Visiting Lecturer in Law at Yale Law School.

Education

Military service

Family
Fidell has been married to Pulitzer Prize-winning reporter Linda Greenhouse since January 1, 1981. Together they have one daughter, filmmaker Hannah Margalit Fidell (born October 7, 1985).

Current practice
Fidell is a former partner with Feldesman Tucker Leifer Fidell LLP, a law firm in Washington, DC.  He joined the firm in 1984, and now is listed as "of counsel." He is often asked to serve as a commentator on military law on TV. For a number of years beginning in 2006 he was an adjunct professor at Washington College of Law.  He has been a visiting lecturer at Harvard Law School. Fidell was a co-founder and is the former president of the National Institute of Military Justice.  His principal present position is as senior research scholar and visiting lecturer at Yale Law School.

Guantanamo
Fidell has been a critic of the Bush Presidency's policy on captives taken in the "war on terror".

Commenting on District Court Judge Joyce Hens Green's analysis of the classified dossiers prepared for captives' Combatant Status Review Tribunals, Fidell said,

Clark Hoyt of The New York Times described Fidell holding back in participating in preparing a brief submitted to the Supreme Court on behalf of National Institute of Military Justice and the Bar Association of the District of Columbia because of the concern it would be considered a conflict of interest, since his wife, journalist Linda Greenhouse, was covering the case. NIMJ is associated with American University's Washington College of Law in Washington, D.C.

Slate magazine published an article written by Emily Bazelon and Dahlia Lithwick, criticizing The New York Times for failing to show more support for their employee.

According to Bazelon and Lithwick, the main critic of Greenhouse covering stories where her husband Fidell has a role is M. Edward Whelan III of the National Review.  They wrote:

The Washington Times published an op-ed by Fidell on 7 December 2008. He concluded,

Publications

References

External links

American lawyers
1945 births
Harvard Law School alumni
Living people
Yale Law School faculty